is the first compilation album released by Japanese singer Maaya Sakamoto. The album was originally released in Japan by Victor Entertainment in 1999, this collection was also released in the United States market by Geneon Entertainment (USA) in 2005. It was re-released in 2010 as a part of Maaya's Debut 15th anniversary reissue series.

Track listing

Note: "24" is the only English-language song in the track list.

Charts

References

Maaya Sakamoto albums
Albums produced by Yoko Kanno
1999 compilation albums
Victor Entertainment compilation albums